Zulfi Syed also known as Zulfikar Syed is an Indian model and actor. Syed Zulfi is a former winner of Gladrags Manhunt Contest. He was a contestant in Bigg Boss.

Biography
Syed was first noticed when he won Gladrags Manhunt contest in the year 1996. He was more recognized for his ad where girls leave lipstick marks all over his body. His wistful, sensuous eyes, finely chiselled face and a well-sculpted body has made him a ramp favourite. His famous ad campaigns are Raymond's, Fiesta condoms, Trevi jeans, Warehouse, Levis etc. He has also acted in music videos like Chahat Desh Se Anewale, Buleyaa, Dhuwa Dhuwa Ho Raha Hai Sama, Tere Khayalon Mein etc. He made his movie debut  in the 1997 Kannada film O Mallige, which received positive response from the audience as well as critics and became highest grosser of the year. He also performed Prince Khurram's role in the mega budget film Taj Mahal (2005).

In 2008, he appeared in the second season of Bigg Boss, the Indian version of Big Brother as a housemate. He was the second runner-up. He made an appearance for his fellow inmate from Bigg Boss (Season 2), Rahul Mahajan's Swayamvar named Rahul Dulhaniya Le Jayega on NDTV Imagine.

Filmography

References

External links
 

21st-century Indian male actors
Indian male models
Male actors from Bangalore
Indian male film actors
Living people
Male actors in Hindi cinema
Male actors in Hindi television
Bigg Boss (Hindi TV series) contestants
Year of birth missing (living people)